Plestiodon tunganus is a species of lizard which is found in China.

References

tunganus
Reptiles described in 1924
Taxa named by Leonhard Stejneger